PSC may refer to:

Business
 Pacific Securities, a Kunming-based company
 People with Significant Control, in United Kingdom company law
 Personal service corporation, in United States tax law
 Powerchip, Taiwanese manufacturer of computer memory
 Protein Sciences Corporation, an American biotech company
 Public Service Commission (disambiguation), regulatory bodies, with competence varying by jurisdiction
 Production sharing contract, a type of contract used in the resource extraction industry

Government
 Public Safety Canada
 Pacific Salmon Commission
 Public Service of Canada

Education
 Parkwood Secondary College, Ringwood North, Victoria, Australia
 Parkdale Secondary College, Mordialloc, Victoria, Australia
 Peter Symonds College, Winchester, UK
 Pensacola State College, Pensacola, Florida
 Peru State College, Peru, Nebraska
 Philippine Science Consortium, an organization of tertiary schools in the Philippines
 Photography Studies College, Melbourne, Victoria, Australia
 Polk State College, Polk County, Florida
 Putonghua Shuiping Ceshi, Mandarin proficiency test in Mainland China

Military
 psc (military), "Principal Staff Course" (British Army, and Air Force), or "Passed Staff Course" (Royal Navy)
 Polar Security Cutter program, a new ship class under deve for the United States Coast Guard
 Private security contractor

Politics
 Centre démocrate humaniste, formerly known as the Christian Social Party (PSC)
 Christian Social Party (Belgium, defunct), a former Belgian party, now called Humanist Democratic Centre
 Christian Social Party (Belgium), a Belgium party in the German-speaking community of Belgium
 Palestine Solidarity Campaign, in the United Kingdom
 Partido Social Conservador, a political party in Nicaragua
 Partido Social Cristiano (disambiguation), name of two political parties, one in Ecuador and the other in Nicaragua
 Partido Socialista de Chile, a Chilean party 
 Partit dels Socialistes de Catalunya, or Socialists' Party of Catalonia, a Catalan party
 Peace and Security Council, of the African Union
 Political and Security Committee, a permanent body of the European Union
 Social Christian Party (Brazil) (Partido Social Cristão), a party in Brazil
 Politburo Standing Committee of the Chinese Communist Party
 Proportionality for Solid Coalitions, a criterion for ranked PR methods

Science and medicine
 Pacific Science Center, a science museum in Seattle, Washington
 Pancreatic stellate cell
 Pediatric Symptom Checklist, a psychological assessment tool
 Phylogenetic species concept
 Pisces (constellation)
 Pluripotent stem cell
 Polar stratospheric cloud
 Postsynaptic current
 Premature stop codon, a type of DNA mutation
 Primary sclerosing cholangitis, a liver disease

Technology
 Palestinian Satellite Channel, TV channel
 Permanent split capacitor, a type of AC motor
 Personal supercomputer, a high-performance computer system
 Pittsburgh Supercomputing Center, National Science Foundation funded Supercomputer center
 PlayStation Classic, a game console by Sony
 Polymer solar cell
 Portable Single Camera, another way of referring to a single-camera setup
 Prestressed concrete
 Printer-Scanner-Copier, a term by Hewlett-Packard

Transport
 Pan-Atlantic Steamship Company
 Port State Control
 Prescot railway station, England; National Rail station code PSC
 Tri-Cities Airport (Washington), Pasco, Washington (airport code)

Other
 P$C or PSC, an American hip hop group
 Palm Springs, California
 Power supply cabinet, a box for electric current delivering devices
 President of the Supreme Court (England, Wales and Northern Ireland) - see pertinent subsections under Judge
 Partille Sport Club, Swedish field- and indoor hockey team
 Philippine Sports Commission
 PSC, Integrated Science Teacher